Jeri Southern (born Genevieve Lillian Hering, August 5, 1926 – August 4, 1991) was an American jazz singer and pianist.

Early years
Born Genevieve Lillian Hering in Royal, Nebraska, United States, Southern was the granddaughter of a German pig farmer who came to the United States in 1879. He built a flour mill in Royal, Nebraska. Her father ran the mill but lost it after the stock market crash of 1929. He then began operating an elevator of the Royal Farmers Union. Her secondary education came at Notre Dame Academy in Omaha, Nebraska, with vocal lessons added to her other classes. She began playing piano at age three and at age six began studying classical piano. She studied piano and voice at Duchesne Academy of the Sacred Heart (Nebraska), where she became interested in jazz.

Career 
After beginning her career at the Blackstone Hotel in Omaha, she joined a United States Navy recruiting tour during World War II. In the late 1940s, she worked in clubs in Chicago where she once played piano for Anita O'Day. During this period, she became known for her singing, particularly for her renditions of torch songs.

Southern signed a contract with Decca Records in 1951 and became known both for pop and jazz. She was the first to record "When I Fall in Love", accompanied by the song's composer, Victor Young and his orchestra with lyrics by Edward Heyman, in April 1952. In 1955, her recording of "An Occasional Man" reached number 89 on the Billboard magazine pop chart.  She sang in films and in 1957 had a hit with "Fire Down Below". The song peaked at number 22 on the UK Singles Chart in June 1957. After joining Capitol Records, she had success with interpretations of Cole Porter songs arranged by Billy May.

Personal life
Southern's marriage to jazz and pop musician Bill Holman ended in divorce.

Her only child, Kathryn King, said Southern stopped performing because of its negative psychological effect. In a 2010 newspaper article, King talked about Southern's shyness, saying she had "a paralyzing case of performance anxiety. Just contemplating performing made her enormously anxious and depressed."

Death
Southern died of a heart attack in Los Angeles, California, in 1991 at the age of 64, a day before her 65th birthday. Although the cause of death was a heart attack, Southern was diabetic and had been diagnosed with double pneumonia.

Discography
 Warm Intimate Songs in the Jeri Southern Style with Dave Barbour (Decca, 1954)
 The Southern Style (Decca, 1955)
 You Better Go Now (Decca, 1956)
 When Your Heart's on Fire (Decca, 1957)
 Jeri Gently Jumps (Decca, 1957)
 Jeri Southern Meets Johnny Smith (Roulette, 1958)
 A Prelude to a Kiss (Decca, 1958)
 Southern Breeze (Roulette, 1958)
 Coffee, Cigarettes & Memories (Roulette, 1958)
 Southern Hospitality (Decca, 1958)
 Jeri Southern Meets Cole Porter (Capitol, 1959)
 Jeri Southern at the Crescendo (Capitol, 1960)
 The Dream's on Jeri (Jasmine, 1998)
 The Very Thought of You: The Decca Years: 1951–1957 (GRP, 1999)
 Southern Hospitality/Jeri Gently Jumps (MCA, 1999)
 Romance in the Dark (Delta Music, 2009)
 The Complete Roulette and Capitol Recordings (Fresh Sound, 2014)
 Jeri Southern Blue Note, Chicago, March 1956 (Uptown Records, 2016)

As guest
 Shorty Rogers, The Shorty Rogers Quintet (Studio West, 1990)

Bibliography

References

External links
 Jeri Southern recordings at the Discography of American Historical Recordings.

1926 births
1991 deaths
Jazz musicians from Nebraska
Musicians from Omaha, Nebraska
Singers from Nebraska
20th-century American pianists
20th-century American singers
20th-century American women singers
American women jazz singers
American jazz pianists
American jazz singers
Traditional pop music singers
Capitol Records artists
Decca Records artists
Roulette Records artists
Deaths from pneumonia in California
People from Antelope County, Nebraska
Deaths from diabetes
20th-century women pianists